I Imera (Greek: Η Ημέρα, English: The Day) was a newspaper that is based in Patras in the Achaea regional unit in Greece.  Its editor-in-chief was Theodoros Kamperos.

See also
List of newspapers in Greece

References
The first version of the article is translated and is based from the article at the Greek Wikipedia (el:Main Page)

Greek-language newspapers
Newspapers published in Patras
Weekly newspapers published in Greece